Saint-Epvre is a commune in the Moselle department, Grand Est, northeastern France.

See also
 Communes of the Moselle department

References

External links
 

Saintepvre